Free Grace Baptist Church, Twickenham is a church that meets in a former Salvation Army hall at Powdermill Lane, Twickenham, TW2 6EJ in the London Borough of Richmond upon Thames. It was founded in 1965 and is a member of the Association of Grace Baptist Churches (South East).

References

1965 establishments in England
Baptist churches in the London Borough of Richmond upon Thames
20th-century Baptist churches in the United Kingdom
Churches in Twickenham
Former Salvation Army citadels